Legionella dresdenensis is a Gram-negative, oxidase-negative, aerobic, non-spore-forming bacterium from the genus Legionella which was isolated from the Elbe in Dresden in Germany.

References

External links
Type strain of Legionella dresdenensis at BacDive -  the Bacterial Diversity Metadatabase

Legionellales
Bacteria described in 2010